Rüzgarlı is a village in the İkizdere District, Rize Province, in Black Sea Region of Turkey. Its population is 117 (2021). Turkish singer Tarkan is from this village.

History 
According to list of villages in Laz language book (2009), name of the village is Mize, which means "dark bird". Most of the villagers are ethnically Laz or Hemshin.

Geography

References

Villages in İkizdere District
Laz settlements in Turkey